Tomáš Ďubek (born 22 January 1987) is a Slovak professional footballer who most recently for ViOn Zlaté Moravce.

Career
Ďubek made his first appearance for Slovakia in 2013 match against Liechtenstein. In the end of the 2012–13 season, he won the award for the best player of Corgoň liga.

In April 2022, Ďubek became the most capped player in the history of the Slovak top division with 423 caps, surpassing previous record holder and former international Viktor Pečovský.

Honours

MFK Ružomberok
 Corgoň Liga (1): 2005-06
 Slovak Cup (1): 2005-06

Individual
Corgoň Liga Player of the Season (1): 2012–13

References

External links

1987 births
Living people
Sportspeople from Zvolen
Slovak footballers
Slovakia under-21 international footballers
Slovakia international footballers
Association football midfielders
MFK Ružomberok players
FC Slovan Liberec players
Zalaegerszegi TE players
FC ViOn Zlaté Moravce players
Slovak Super Liga players
Czech First League players
Nemzeti Bajnokság II players
Expatriate footballers in Hungary
Expatriate footballers in the Czech Republic
Slovak expatriate sportspeople in Hungary
Slovak expatriate sportspeople in the Czech Republic
Slovak expatriate footballers